The 2015–16 Stephen F. Austin Ladyjacks basketball team represented Stephen F. Austin University during the 2015–16 NCAA Division I women's basketball season. The Ladyjacks were led by first year head coach Mark Kellogg and played their home games at the William R. Johnson Coliseum. They were members of the Southland Conference. They finished the season 18–12, 12–6 in Southland play to finish in fourth place. They lost in the quarterfinals of the Southland women's tournament to Sam Houston State. Despite having 18 wins, they were not invited to a postseason tournament.

Roster

Schedule

|-
!colspan=9 style="background:#5F259F; color:#FFFFFF;"| Non-conference regular season

|-
!colspan=9 style="background:#5F259F; color:#FFFFFF;"| Southland Conference regular season

|-
!colspan=9 style="background:#5F259F; color:#FFFFFF;"| Southland Women's Tournament

See also
2015–16 Stephen F. Austin Lumberjacks basketball team

References

Stephen F. Austin Ladyjacks basketball seasons
Stephen F. Austin
Stephen F. Austin Ladyjacks basketball
Stephen F. Austin Ladyjacks basketball